The Sunjiawan Formation is a geological formation in Liaoning, China, with strata possibly dating back to the early Late Cretaceous, specifically the Cenomanian. Dinosaur remains are among the fossils that have been recovered from the formation. It forms part of the same geological sequence as the older and underlying Yixian Formation and Jiufotang Formation. It primarily consists of variegated conglomerates with rare intercalations of thin bedded sandstones, siltstones and mudstones.

Dinosaurs 
Remains of the following dinosaurs have been found in the formation:

Ornithischians 
Remains of the following dinosaurs have been found in the formation:

See also 
 List of dinosaur-bearing rock formations
 Zhumapu Formation

References

Bibliography

Further reading 
 H. You, Q. Ji, J. Li and Y. Li. 2003. A new hadrosauroid dinosaur from the mid-Cretaceous of Liaoning, China. Acta Geologica Sinica 77(2):148-154
 Z.-M. Dong. 2002. A new armored dinosaur (Ankylosauria) from Beipiao Basin, Liaoning Province, northeastern China. Vertebrata PalAsiatica 40(4):276-285

Geologic formations of China
Upper Cretaceous Series of Asia
Cretaceous China
Cenomanian Stage
Sandstone formations
Siltstone formations
Mudstone formations
Paleontology in Liaoning